Mohamed Hikal (born January 10, 1979) is an Egyptian boxer. He won the bronze medal in the men's middleweight division (75 kg) at the 2005 World Amateur Boxing Championships. He competed in four Olympic Games from 2000-2012.

Career
Hikal won the gold medal in the welterweight division at the 2003 All-Africa Games in Abuja, Nigeria.

He also participated in the 2004 Summer Olympics for his native North African country. There, Hikal was defeated in the second round of the welterweight (69 kg) division by Russia's eventual bronze medalist, Oleg Saitov.

Hikal subsequently moved up to middleweight, and later managed to upset defending world champion Gennady Golovkin and win the bronze medal in the middleweight (75 kg) division at the 2005 World Amateur Boxing Championships.

At the 2008 Olympics, he lost his first bout to James DeGale.  At the 2012 Olympics he lost in the first round to Soltan Migitinov.

External links

1979 births
Living people
Welterweight boxers
Middleweight boxers
Boxers at the 2000 Summer Olympics
Boxers at the 2004 Summer Olympics
Boxers at the 2008 Summer Olympics
Boxers at the 2012 Summer Olympics
Olympic boxers of Egypt
Egyptian male boxers
AIBA World Boxing Championships medalists
Mediterranean Games gold medalists for Egypt
Competitors at the 2005 Mediterranean Games
African Games gold medalists for Egypt
African Games medalists in boxing
Mediterranean Games medalists in boxing
Competitors at the 2003 All-Africa Games
Competitors at the 1999 All-Africa Games
21st-century Egyptian people